Kobylin  is a village in the administrative district of Gmina Rogów, within Brzeziny County, Łódź Voivodeship, in central Poland.

References

Villages in Brzeziny County